Manion's General Store is a historic general store and post office located at Ferndale in Sullivan County, New York.  It was built before 1908 and is a large, frame building.  It is two and one half stories tall, five bays wide and three bays deep, with a gable roof and deep overhanging eaves.  It is built into a hillside and has a stone foundation.  The store operated into the 1970s and the post office to the 1980s.

It was added to the National Register of Historic Places in 2004.

References

Commercial buildings on the National Register of Historic Places in New York (state)
Commercial buildings completed in 1915
Buildings and structures in Sullivan County, New York
National Register of Historic Places in Sullivan County, New York
General stores in the United States